Bathybagrus stappersii is a species of fish endemic to Lake Tanganyika on the border of Burundi, the Democratic Republic of the Congo, Tanzania, and Zambia. It grows to a length of 45.0 cm (17.7 inches) SL and is a component of local subsistence fisheries.

References

 

Claroteidae
Fish of Lake Tanganyika
Fish described in 1917
Taxonomy articles created by Polbot
Taxobox binomials not recognized by IUCN